Wedelia spilanthoides is a herbaceous flowering plant in the family Asteraceae. The natural habitat is open woodland of Australia and New Guinea. It was first described by Victorian State Botanist Ferdinand von Mueller in 1865.

References 

spilanthoides
Flora of Queensland
Flora of New South Wales
Taxa named by Ferdinand von Mueller